Henry Timothy Vakoc ("VAH-kitch") (January 8, 1960 – June 20, 2009) was a Roman Catholic priest and a United States Army chaplain during the Iraq War, attaining the rank of major. He was critically injured on May 29, 2004, when his Humvee was struck by an IED (improvised explosive device) as he was returning from celebrating Mass for soldiers. He was also the first documented U.S. Army chaplain seriously injured during Operation Iraqi Freedom. He died on June 20, 2009.

Early years
Vakoc was born on January 8, 1960, in Robbinsdale, Minnesota.  He graduated in 1978 from Benilde-St. Margaret's School, Minneapolis. He graduated from St. Cloud State University, St. Cloud, Minnesota and was a member of Tau Kappa Epsilon fraternity.  He was also a member of the fraternity staff, visiting chapters in the midwestern and northeastern United States.

Seminary and priesthood
He attended Saint Paul Seminary School of Divinity, at the University of St. Thomas, St. Paul, Minnesota. On May 30, 1992, he was ordained a Roman Catholic priest, for the Archdiocese of Saint Paul and Minneapolis.

Vakoc's first assignment was as associate pastor at St. Charles Borromeo Church, in St. Anthony, Minn. (1992–1993). He later served as associate pastor of St. John Neumann Church, in Eagan, Minn. (1993–1996). He left that post to join the Army.

Military service
Vakoc became an Army chaplain in 1996, receiving his commission as a lieutenant in the Army chaplain corps. His first assignment was Garrison Catholic Priest in Heidelberg, Germany.  He then was reassigned to Hanau, Germany,  During that time he deployed to Bosnia.  He was assigned to Fort Carson, Colo., where he served for three and a half years. He was then assigned as chaplain for the 44th Corps Support Battalion from Fort Lewis, Wash. The 44th provided logistical support to the Fort Lewis-based units in northern Iraq, including the Task Force Olympia headquarters and the 3rd Brigade, 2nd Infantry Division, the Army's first Stryker vehicle brigade. The 44th was sent to Iraq in November 2003.

While in Iraq Vakoc endeavored to celebrate Mass for soldiers in the 296th Brigade Support Battalion – stationed in Mosul – no matter where they were located, in an area the size of Connecticut, sometimes for only two or three soldiers in remote outposts. In a letter to his sister, Vakoc said, "The safest place for me to be is in the center of God's will, and if that is in the line of fire, that is where I will be."

Vakoc was injured on May 29, 2004 – the day before his twelfth anniversary of his ordination to the priesthood – while returning from saying Mass for soldiers in the field in Iraq when his Humvee struck a roadside bomb (IED). He sustained a severe brain injury. He was treated at an Army field hospital in Baghdad and was then evacuated to Landstuhl Regional Medical Center in Germany. On June 2, 2004, he was transported to Walter Reed Army Medical Center, Washington, D.C.

Post-injury
Vakoc received the Purple Heart in his room at Walter Reed Army Medical Center during a private ceremony limited to immediate family members, Army personnel, and then-U.S. Senator Norm Coleman, who presented the medal. Due to the seriousness of Vakoc's injuries and his unstable condition, Coleman was able to expedite the granting of the award.

After several months, he was transferred to the Minneapolis VA Medical Center, where he lay in a coma for six months. In the late spring of 2005, he began to show signs of improvement. With the help of the Yellow Ribbon Fund, a special computer was donated so that he could communicate with others. On June 1, 2005, a flag – signed by Vakoc and his unit – was given to him. His first message to the visitors who presented the flag was "TIM 4F" (the military code for unfit for duty) and then "OK".

Death
Vakoc died on June 20, 2009, at a nursing home in New Hope, Minnesota. His body was interred in Fort Snelling National Cemetery, Minneapolis.

Awards and decorations
Vakoc was awarded the following medals:
  – Bronze Star
  – Purple Heart
  – Combat Action Badge

Honors
On June 1, 2007, Vakoc received the 2007 Distinguished Alumnus Award from his alma mater, the Saint Paul Seminary School of Divinity.

In spring 2011, the Father H. Timothy Vakoc Council 15269 received its charter from the Supreme Council of the Knights of Columbus. The council is located at Fort Carson, Colorado, and is one of more than 15,342 councils around the world and including 1.9 million members.

See also
 Northwood Gratitude and Honor Memorial
 Four Chaplains – four U.S. Army Chaplains killed during World War II
 Roman Catholic Archdiocese for the Military Services, USA

Footnotes

References
 "Army Chaplain Lived Vocation", The Priest, September 2009, page 90 (Our Sunday Visitor).

External links
 Pronechen, Joseph, "In Iraq, Soldiers Find Their Greatest Allies in Chaplains", NCRegister.com, May 30, 2004. Circle Media, Inc. (National Catholic Register). Retrieved 2009-09-13.
 Minnesota Army Chaplain Timothy Vakoc receives Purple Heart", CatholicMil.org (Catholics in the Military), July 5, 2004. Retrieved 2009-09-13.
 "Updated on Chaplain Timothy Vakoc", CatholicMil.org (Catholics in the Military), September 2, 2004. Retrieved 2009-09-13.
 "Priest, injured in Iraq, utters first words in over 2 years", Catholic News Agency, November 9, 2006. Retrieved 2009-09-13.
 Lerner, Maura, "December 17, 2006: A prayer for Father Tim: Drawn to the Minnesota priest who was gravely wounded in Iraq, a devoted circle of supporters has seen small miracles in his slow healing", Star Tribune, December 18, 2006. Retrieved 2009-09-13.
 "Army Priest Accepts His Cross", CatholicMil.org (Catholics in the Military), February 28, 2007 (posted March 1, 2007). Retrieved 2009-09-13.
 "Chaplain Dies From Iraq War Injuries, Priest Embraced God's Will in Line of Fire", ZENIT.org, June 22, 2009 (posted on EWTNews, EWTN.com, June 23, 2009). ZENIT.org News Agency. Retrieved 2009-09-13.
 "Henry Timothy Vakoc / New Hope, Minnesota / June 20, 2009", Iraq/Afghanistan War Heroes, June 22, 2009. Q Madp, Portland, Ore. Retrieved 2009-09-13.
 "Brave Catholic Army chaplain dies from injuries suffered in Iraq", Catholic News Agency, June 23, 2009. Retrieved 2009-09-13.
 Lerner, Maura, "Hundreds paid respects to the Rev. Timothy Vakoc at the Cathedral of St. Paul. Gravely injured in Iraq in 2004, he died last Saturday at 49", Star Tribune, June 26, 2009. Retrieved 2009-09-13.
 

1960 births
2009 deaths
People from Robbinsdale, Minnesota
People from St. Anthony, Minnesota
American military personnel killed in the Iraq War
Military personnel from Minnesota
Religious leaders from Minnesota
Roman Catholic Archdiocese of Saint Paul and Minneapolis
United States Army officers
United States Army chaplains
St. Cloud State University alumni
Saint Paul Seminary School of Divinity alumni
Catholics from Minnesota
20th-century American Roman Catholic priests
United States Army personnel of the Iraq War